Micheline Daigle is a former politician in Montreal, Quebec, Canada. She served on the Montreal city council from 1986 to 1994 as a member of the Montreal Citizens' Movement (MCM).

Daigle was administrator of the Rene Goupil community education centre and led a citizens' lobby group called Regroupe-Action in Montreal's Saint-Michel neighbourhood in the mid-1980s. She was first elected to council in the 1986 municipal election, centering her campaign around local opposition to the Miron Quarry urban landfill site. The MCM won a landslide majority in this election, and Daigle served as a backbench supporter of Jean Doré's administration. In 1988, she has named as vice-chair of Montreal's community development committee.

She was re-elected in the 1990 election and served a second four-year term. She was defeated in 1994, amidst a swing away from her party.

Electoral record

References

Living people
Montreal city councillors
Women municipal councillors in Canada
Year of birth missing (living people)